Dongzhai is a village in the west of Henan province, China. It is under the administration of Dongsong town, in Luoning County, Luoyang. Road building and clean water projects were started in Dingzhai in the late 2010s.

References

Villages in China